The following is a timeline of the history of the city of Genoa, Liguria, Italy.

Prior to 16th century

 209 BC - Town sacked by Carthaginians.
 643 AD - Lombards take power (approximate date).
 900 - Santa Maria di Castello built (approximate date).
 935 - Fatimid sack of Genoa
 972 - Santo Stefano consecrated.
 1005 - Republic of Genoa established.
 1049 - Santi Cosma e Damiano construction begins.
 1118 - Genoa Cathedral consecrated by Pope Gelasius II
 1126 - San Matteo founded.
 1133 - Roman Catholic Archdiocese of Genoa created.
 1163 - Porta Soprana, Porta dei Vacca, and Porta Aurea built (approximate date).
 1189 - San Donato consecrated.
 1260
 Palazzo San Giorgio built.
 Sant'Agostino consecrated.
 1275 - Doge's Palace built.
 1284 - Battle of Meloria.
 1308 - San Bartolomeo degli Armeni founded.
 1330 - Fortifications expanded (approximate date).
 1339 - Simone Boccanegra appointed doge.
 1347 - Black Death plague.
 1354 - Public clock installed.
 1407 - Banco di San Giorgio founded.
 1453 - Oratory of San Giacomo della Marina built.
 1474 - Printing press in operation (approximate date).
 1481 - University of Genoa established.

16th-18th centuries

 1520 - Basilica della Santissima Annunziata del Vastato construction begins.
 1540 - Palazzo Bianco built.
 1543 - Lighthouse of Genoa lit.
 1576 - Rolli di Genova created.
 1583
 Strada Maggiore laid out.
 Santa Maria Assunta, Genoa consecrated.
 1585 - San Pietro in Banchi, Genoa built.
 1619 - San Siro restored.
 1624 - Basilica di Nostra Signora Assunta, Genoa built.
 1625 - Relief of Genoa.
 1632 - Fortifications expanded (approximate date).
 1639 - Michele Castelli publishes the Genova (newspaper 1639–1646), the oldest newspaper of Italy
 1642 - Alessandro Botticelli publishes the Genova (newspaper 1642–1684), later known as Il Sincero
 1655 - Palazzo Stefano Balbi built.
 1677 - Palazzo Rosso built.
 1684 - Bombardment of Genoa.
 1706 - The church of the Nostra Signora della Consolazione e San Vincenzo martire built.
 1733 - San Torpete rebuilt.
 1747 - Siege of Genoa.
 1770 - Santissimo Nome di Maria e degli Angeli Custodi built.
 1775 - Biblioteca Civica Berio (library) established.
 1777 - The newspaper Avvisi started to be printed.
 1794 - Giardino botanico Clelia Durazzo Grimaldi established.
 1797 - Genoa becomes part of Ligurian Republic.

 1800
 April - Siege of Genoa.
 April - Battle of Sassello.

19th century

 1803 - Orto Botanico dell'Università di Genova established.
 1814 - Revolt against France.
 1815
 Republic of Genoa ends.
 Genoa incorporated into Piedmont (Kingdom of Sardinia)
 1817 -  (state archives) established.
 1824 - Corriere Mercantile newspaper begins publication.
 1828 - Teatro Carlo Felice opens.
 1837 - Acquasola park laid out.
 1846 - Villa Durazzo-Pallavicini park constructed.
 1849
 Revolt of Genoa.
 Santi Quirico e Giulitta renovation begins.
 1851 - Monumental Cemetery of Staglieno established.
 1853 - Genova Sampierdarena railway station built.
 1857 -  (history society) founded.
 1860 - Genova Piazza Principe railway station opens.
 1867 - Museo Civico di Storia Naturale di Genova opens.
 1868 - Genoa–Ventimiglia railway begins operating.
 1870 - Banca di Genova established.
 1871 - Population: 130,269.
 1876 - Via di Circonvallazione a Monte laid out.
 1879 - Yacht Club Italiano founded.
 1887 - Via XX Settembre laid out.
 1890 - Stazione marittima di Genova built.
 1892
 Albertis Castle built.
  holds its first conference in Genoa.
 1893
 Genoa Cricket and Football Club founded.
 Garibaldi statue in Piazza De Ferrari unveiled.
 1895 - Via di Circonvallazione a Mare laid out.
 1897 - Population: 228,862.

20th century

 1905
 Genova Brignole railway station opens.
 Edoardo Chiossone Museum of Oriental Art opens.
 1911 - Stadio Luigi Ferraris opens as the Marassi.
 1912 - Stock exchange built.
 1914 - International exhibition of marine and maritime hygiene is held.
 1915 - Corso Italia constructed.
 1922
 City hosts Genoa Conference.
 Palazzo Reale opens as a public museum.
 1936 - Museo di Archeologia Ligure founded.
 1938 - First trolleybus system opens.
 1940 - Terrazza Martini Tower built.
 1946 - U.C. Sampdoria football club formed.
 1962
 Airport opens.
 Genoa International Boat Show begins.
 1966 Euroflora begins.
 1970 - 7 October: .
 1973 - First trolleybus system closes.
 1975 - Teatro della Tosse founded.
 1990
 Genoa Metro begins operating.
 City hosts 1990 FIFA World Cup games.
 1992
 Aquarium opens.
 Genoa Expo '92 held.
 27 September: Genoa flood of 1992
 1993 - 23 September: Genoa flood of 1993
 1997 - Second trolleybus system opens.
 1999 - Deledda International School established.

21st century

 2001 - City hosts 27th G8 summit.
 2004
 City designated a European Capital of Culture.
 Galata Museo del Mare opens.
 2012 - Marco Doria elected mayor.
 2017 - Marco Bucci elected mayor.
 2018 - Ponte Morandi bridge collapses. Marco Bucci appointed commissioner for the reconstruction of the new bridge.
 2020 - COVID-19 pandemic - Viadotto Genova-San Giorgio rebuilt during the COVID-19 pandemic to replace the Ponte Morandi. It projected by Renzo Piano.
 2021 - COVID-19 vaccination
 2022 
 Euroflora, Nervi
 Marco Bucci re-elected mayor.
 During the first day of inauguration of the 62nd Genoa International Boat Show, on 22 September 2022, an earthquake of magnitude Mw 4.0 earthquake occurred in region: 2 km W Bargagli (Genoa), on 22-09-2022 13:39:59 (UTC) - 22-09-2022 15:39:59 (UTC +02:00) Italian time and geographic coordinates (lat, lon) 44.4390, 9.0680 at 10 km depth.
 On 4 October 2022, an earthquake of magnitude ML 3.5 earthquake occurred in region: 2 km SW Bargagli (Genoa), on 04-10-2022 21:41:09 (UTC) - 04-10-2022 23:41:09 (UTC +02:00) Italian time and geographic coordinates (lat, lon) 44.4610, 9.0630 at 8 km depth.
 2023 Genoa becomes the finish of The Ocean Race.

See also
 History of Genoa
 List of mayors of Genoa
 Republic of Genoa (1005–1815)
 Doge of Genoa
 Dukes of Genoa (1831-1996)

Timelines of other cities in the macroregion of Northwest Italy:(it)
 Lombardy region: Timeline of Bergamo; Brescia; Cremona; Mantua; Milan; Pavia
 Piedmont region: Timeline of Novara; Turin

References

Bibliography

in English
Published in the 19th century
 
 
 
 
 
 
 

Published in the 20th-21st century
 
 
  +  1870 ed.

in Italian

in Ukrainian

 Гавриленко О. А., Сівальньов О. М., Цибулькін В. В. Генуезька спадщина на теренах України; етнодержавознавчий вимір. — Харків: Точка, 2017.— 260 с. —

External links

 Europeana. Items related to Genoa, various dates.

 
Genoa